David Lynn may refer to:

David Lynn (architect) (1873–1961), American architect
David Lynn (golfer) (born 1973), English golfer
David Lynn (rugby league), rugby league footballer for Scotland, and Edinburgh Eagles
David Lynn (footballer), footballer who currently plays for Thame United.